Antonio Américo Tróccoli (21 February 1925 – 27 February 1995) was an Argentine politician. He served as Minister of Interior for president Raúl Alfonsín.

References

Ministers of Internal Affairs of Argentina
Radical Civic Union politicians
1925 births
1995 deaths